is a city in southwestern Kōchi Prefecture, Japan. , the city had an estimated population of 32,593 in 16635 households, and a population density of 52 persons per km².

Geography
Shimanto is located in southwestern Kōchi Prefecture.  Both the Shimanto River and the Ushirogawa River run through the city. River levels often rise in summer and autumn due to the rainy season and seasonal typhoons. Shimanto's population is spread across a large area, broken up by rivers, mountains and uninhabited or sparsely inhabited areas.

Neighbouring municipalities 
Kōchi Prefecture
 Sukumo
 Tosashimizu
 Shimanto Town
 Mihara
 Kuroshio
Ehime Prefecture
 Uwjima
 Matsuno

Climate
Shimanto has a wet subtropical climate (Köppen climate classification Cfa) with hot humid summers and cool to cold winters. Humidity levels are high during the hot summer months. Snow is rare and occurs only once or twice in a year. Rainfall is significant throughout the year, but heavier during the rainy season in June and July, and also in September, when a large number of typhoons hit Japan.

Demographics
Per Japanese census data, the population of Shimanto in 2020 is 32,694 people. Shimanto has been conducting censuses since 1960.

History 
As with all of Kōchi Prefecture, the area of Shimanto City was part of ancient Tosa Province.  During the Kofun period and Nara period, the area of western Tosa was called "Hata" and was ruled by the Hata Kuni no miyatsuko. The Hata clan dominated the area well into the Heian period. During the Kamakura period much of the area became part of a vast shōen landed estate controlled by the Kujō family of aristocrats from Kyoto. Kujō Michiie left the estate to his third son, Ichijō Sanetsune, who was the founding father of Ichijō family. During the Onin War, the kanpaku Ichijō Norifusa fled Kyoto in 1468 and settled in Nakamura, in what is now Shimanto. He remodeled the village on Kyoto, giving rise to the nickname of "the little Kyoto of Tosa", During the Sengoku period, the Ichijō were defeated by the Chōsokabe clan at the 1575 Battle of Shimantogawa. Following the establishment of the Tokugawa shogunate,  the area was part of the holdings of Tosa Domain ruled by the Yamauchi clan from their seat at Kōchi Castle, with Nakamura becoming the seat of a 30,000 koku subsidiary domain until 1689. In this year, the head of the Nakamura fief was punished for the offence of turning down a post on the Tokugawa Junior Council. The local castle was destroyed, the fief's finances were confiscated, retainers were stripped of their incomes, and the samurai dwellings were destroyed, forcing them to scatter and become farmers or merchants. The Nakamura area lost a great deal of wealth and independence, and became a minor rural region.

Following the Meiji restoration, the village of Nakamura was established within Hata District, Kōchi with the creation of the modern municipalities system on October 1, 1889 and was raised to town status on November 10, 1898. The area was almost entirely destroyed by the 1946 Nankai earthquake, as a result of which very few historical buildings remain. Photographs of the area after the earthquake can be seen in the city museum.  On March 31, 1954, Nakamura merged with ten neighboring villages and was raised to city status. The city of Shimanto was established on April 10, 2005, from the merger of the city of Nakamura, and the village of Nishitosa (from Hata District).

Government
Shimanto has a mayor-council form of government with a directly elected mayor and a unicameral city council of 20 members. Shimanto contributes two members to the Kōchi Prefectural Assembly. In terms of national politics, the city is part of Kōchi 2nd district of the lower house of the Diet of Japan.

Districts
Shimanto city is divided into thirteen districts.
 
 
 
 
 
 
 
 
 
 
 
 
 

The largest district is Nakamura, with a population of 9,352 residents as of November 2013. The smallest is Toyama, with 882 residents.

Economy
The local economy is dominated by agriculture, forestry and commercial fishing, and tourism.

Education
Shimanto City has 13 public elementary schools and four public middle schools operated by the town government, and one public middle school and three public high schools operated by the Kōchi Prefectural Board of Education. The prefecture also operates one special education school for the handicapped.

Sister cities
The following cities were twinned with Nakamura before it became part of Shimanto.

Domestic
  Betsukai, Hokkaido
  Shionoe, Kagawa

International
  Bozhou, Anhui, China

Transportation

Railway
 Shikoku Railway Company - Yodo Line
 -  - 
Tosa Kuroshio Railway Nakamura Line
 
Tosa Kuroshio Railway Sukumo Line
  -  -

Highway

Local attractions
 Nakamura Castle ruins
 Taihei-ji
 Fuba-Hachimangu
 Ichijo Shrine
 Dragonfly Natural Park

Notable people from Shimanto
Masato Honda (1962-), saxophone player, composer, and multi-instrumentalist well-known for being T-Square saxophonist from 1991 until 1997.
Shūsui Kōtoku (1871-1911), radical journalist who played a key role in introducing anarchism to Japan in the early 20th century, executed for treason
Torahiko Miyahata (1903-1988), freestyle swimmer who represented Japan in the 1924 Summer Olympics
Mayo Okamoto (1974-), pop singer-songwriter, whose 1995 debut single "Tomorrow" reached number 1 on the Oricon weekly single charts

References

External links

 

Cities in Kōchi Prefecture
Populated coastal places in Japan